Tyree Hollins (born March 26, 1992) is a Canadian football defensive back for the Montreal Alouettes of the Canadian Football League (CFL). He played college football at Grambling State University and attended Carroll High School in Monroe, Louisiana. He has also been a member of the Saskatchewan Roughriders of the CFL.

College career
Hollins played in 37 games for the Grambling State Tigers from 2011 to 2014, recording nine interceptions for 147 return yards. He accumulated 72 tackles, five interceptions, two forced fumbles and a fumble recovery his senior year.

Professional career

Saskatchewan Roughriders
Hollins signed with the Saskatchewan Roughriders in May 2015. He made his CFL debut on July 5, 2015 against the Toronto Argonauts. He played in thirteen games, all starts, for the team during the 2015 season, recording 44 defensive tackles, seven pass knockdowns, and five special teams tackles. Hollins spent one game on the practice roster and four games on the injured list. He was released by the team on June 19, 2016.

Montreal Alouettes
Hollins was signed to the Montreal Alouettes' practice roster on August 17, 2016.

References

External links
Just Sports Stats

Living people
1992 births
American football defensive backs
Canadian football defensive backs
African-American players of American football
African-American players of Canadian football
Grambling State Tigers football players
Saskatchewan Roughriders players
Montreal Alouettes players
Players of American football from Louisiana
Sportspeople from Monroe, Louisiana
21st-century African-American sportspeople